John Mulroy (born 27 December 1989) is an Irish former footballer who played as a forward for Bray Wanderers and Athlone Town. He scored in the semi-final of the 2009 FAI Cup. He was Bray's youngest ever player to score in a first-team match.

References

1989 births
Living people
Republic of Ireland association footballers
Association football forwards
Bray Wanderers F.C. players
Athlone Town A.F.C. players